New Order may refer to:

Politics 

 L'Ordine Nuovo (The New Order), a socialist newspaper edited by Antonio Gramsci in the early 1920s
 New Order in East Asia, propaganda term for Japanese-dominated East Asia announced by Japanese prime minister Konoe Fumimaro in 1938
 New Order in the Middle East, the name informally given to Ariel Sharon's plans during the 1982 First Lebanon War
 New Order (Indonesia) (Orde Baru), former Indonesian president Suharto's regime
 New Order (Nazism) (Neuordnung), Nazi term for the set of geopolitical and ideological goals which the Third Reich aimed to impose during the 1940s
 Ordre Nouveau (1940s), Vichy French term for the above Neuordnung
 New Order (United States), an American neo-Nazi religious group
 New Order (Portugal), a neo-fascist party that existed between 1978 and 1982
 New Order (Venezuela), a far-right revolutionary nationalist political party 1974–2002
 Ordine Nuovo, an Italian far right organization
 Ordre Nouveau (1930s), a French non-conformist organization
 Ordre Nouveau (1960s), a French nationalist organisation (1969–73)
 Shintaisen ("New Order" in Japanese), the political movement promoted by the Taisei Yokusankai (Imperial Rule Assistance Association) in World War II

Arts and entertainment

Music 

 New Order (band), a British band formed in 1980, the successor to Joy Division
 The New Order (band), an American hard-rock band including members of the Stooges, the MC5, and Tom Petty & The Heartbreakers
 The New Order (album), a 1988 album by American thrash metal band Testament
 "The New Order", song by Blind Guardian from the 2006 album A Twist in the Myth

Film 

 In the Star Wars franchise:
 New Order (Galactic Alliance), the new system for the Galactic Federation of Free Alliances established by Darth Caedus
 New Order (Imperial), the social and political system of the Galactic Empire
 New Order (Mandalorian), Cassus Fett's ideal of the Mandalorian Neo-Crusaders during the Mandalorian Wars
 New Order (Separatist), the ideals of the Confederacy of Independent Systems
 The main antagonists of the 1986 film Cobra
 Scanners II: The New Order, a 1991 film
 New Order (film), a 2020 Mexican-French drama film

Television 

 "New Order" (Code Lyoko episode), an episode of the television program Code Lyoko
 "New Order" (Stargate SG-1), a 2004 two part episode of the television program Stargate SG-1
 The New Order, a Xiaolin Showdown episode

Other uses 

 Novus ordo seclorum, Latin for "New Order of the Ages", appears on the back of the U.S. dollar bill since 1935
 Novus Ordo Missae, the Roman-Rite Mass as revised after the Second Vatican Council (1962–65)
 Wolfenstein: The New Order, a sequel to the 2009 video game Wolfenstein and a re-imaging of the franchise
 Nizam-i Djedid (New Order), series of reforms made by the Ottoman government during the reign of Selim III

See also 
 New world order (politics)
 Old Order (disambiguation)
 Estado Novo (disambiguation)
 New World Order (disambiguation)
 NWO (disambiguation)
 Ordre Nouveau (disambiguation)